The Last Night is a 1928 German silent historical film directed by A.W. Sandberg and starring Diomira Jacobini, Gösta Ekman and Karina Bell. Produced and distributed by Terra Film, it was shot at the company's Marienfelde Studios in Berlin. The film's sets were designed by the art director Hans Jacoby.

Cast
 Diomira Jacobini as Alaine
 Gösta Ekman as Marc-Anton
 Karina Bell as Leontine
 Walter Rilla as Ernest
 Fritz Kortner as Montaloup
 Paul Henckels as Prosper
 Ernst Behmer

References

Bibliography
 Qvist, Per Olov & von Bagh, Peter. Guide to the Cinema of Sweden and Finland. Greenwood Publishing Group, 2000.

External links

1928 films
Films of the Weimar Republic
German silent feature films
Films directed by A. W. Sandberg
German films based on plays
French Revolution films
Terra Film films
1920s historical films
German historical films
Films set in the 18th century
German black-and-white films
1920s German films
Films shot at Terra Studios